Frisky Dingo is an American adult animated cartoon series created by Adam Reed and Matt Thompson for Adult Swim. The series revolves around the conflict between a supervillain named Killface and a superhero named Awesome X, alias billionaire Xander Crews, and much of the show's humor focuses on parodying superhero and action-movie clichés.

It debuted on October 16, 2006, and its first season ended on January 22, 2007. The second season premiered on August 26, 2007, and ended on March 23, 2008. A third season was considered, but both the creators and Adult Swim mutually decided against it. The production company,  70/30 Productions, subsequently went out of business in January 2009.

A spin-off show, The Xtacles, premiered on November 9, 2008, but only two episodes were aired prior to the production company's closure.

Origins
Frisky Dingo was created by 70/30 Productions, the same group of animators who worked on Sealab 2021. The show's name during development was Whiskey Tango. Because a band was already using the name, it was changed to Whiskey Tango Six. This name was determined not to be sufficiently distinct to avoid infringement suits, so the creators jokingly said they would call the show Frisky Dingo, and the name remained. In episode 113, Killface can be seen entering "Frisky Dingo" into the Annihilatrix launch terminal; this is mentioned in the second episode of the second season, where Sinn/Hooper remarks that "Frisky Dingo" is the launch code for the Annihilatrix.

According to an article in Atlanta Magazine, Whiskey Tango Six was going to be the name of the six-member superhero group on which the show focused, headed by husband and wife Jack and Grace Taggart. The team flew around in a spaceship called the Glennis. Killface was going to be the main villain, but not a major character. During revisions of the show's scripts, Killface became the focus of the show. When Whiskey Tango Six was replaced with Xander Crews/Awesome X and the Xtacles is not known.

Characters

The two main characters of the show are Killface, who is a naked, bone-white, red-eyed, earless, talon-toed, spur-heeled, 440 lb., hairless, muscular humanoid supervillain focused on destroying Earth with his invention, the Annihilatrix; and billionaire tycoon Xander Crews, who fights crime under the superhero alias Awesome X. Both Killface and Xander are voiced by co-creator Adam Reed. The two have an ever-shifting relationship, changing from enemies to unwilling allies on many occasions.

Other major characters include Killface's son Simon – voiced by Christian Danley – an overweight, blond-haired, pale-skinned, sexually confused, teenaged Hannah Montana fan, who wears sweater vests and exhibits adolescent rebellion by muttering and breaking cereal bowls; reporter Grace Ryan, former girlfriend of Xander Crews turned into Antagone, a toxic, radioactive ant-powered villainess; Sinn – voiced by Kelly Jenrette – later known as Hooper, originally Killface's sidekick and later his enemy; and the Xtacles, Awesome X's team of easily distracted and remarkably inept, rocket-booted troops.

Setting
Frisky Dingo takes place primarily in and around a large city simply called "Town" or "the Town".  Its actual name never being mentioned becomes a running joke throughout the series.  Despite its lack of a specific name, maps of "Town" are featured throughout the series, which closely resemble interstate roadmaps of the city of Atlanta, Georgia, where 70/30 Studios, producers of Frisky Dingo, were based. Additional evidence for "Town" being Atlanta is the presence of buildings suspiciously resembling the Cotton Mill Lofts (a location that at one time housed production operations for 70/30) burning in the second episode, "Meet Awesome-X". Also, in the episode where Killface is pandering to the African American church congregation, he is wearing what looks like Michael Vick's Atlanta Falcons football jersey.

Episodes

Series overview

Season 1 (2006–07)
The first season of Frisky Dingo follows the adversarial relationship between the villainous Killface, who aspires to strike fear into humankind before he drives the Earth into the Sun with his Annihilatrix, and Awesome X, the secret superhero identity of multibillionaire Xander Crews, who dreads retiring after having defeated the last known supervillain.

Season 2 (2007–08)
At the beginning of the second season, Killface is taking credit for "curing" global warming due to the Annihilatrix having moved the Earth a total of three feet further from the Sun before it malfunctioned, and has decided to run for President of the United States. Xander Crews follows suit, reforming his company and launching his own presidential campaign.

International broadcast
In Canada, Frisky Dingo previously aired on Teletoon's Teletoon at Night block, and currently airs on the Canadian version of Adult Swim.

Home releases

Spin-off
The Xtacles is a spin-off from Frisky Dingo in which the Xtacles, Xander Crews' private army, take a lead role. The series revolves around the Xtacles' lack of direction following the abduction of their leader by aliens at the end of Frisky Dingo. They take on random missions from President Stan, who returns from the previous series. The series premiered its only two episodes on November 9, 2008.

Episodes

References

External links

 
 

2000s American adult animated television series
2000s American parody television series
2000s American superhero comedy television series
2006 American television series debuts
2008 American television series endings
American adult animated comedy television series
American adult animated superhero television series
American flash adult animated television series
English-language television shows
Adult Swim original programming
Television series created by Adam Reed
Television series created by Matt Thompson
Television series by Williams Street